Magnetic gait is a form of gait abnormality.

Presentation
The person's feet seem attached to the floor as if by a magnet. In magnetic gait, each step is initiated in a "wresting" motion carrying feet upward and forward. Magnetic gait can be visualized in terms of a powerful magnet being forcefully pulled from a
steel plate.

Associated conditions
 Normal pressure hydrocephalus (NPH)

See also
 Bruns ataxia

References

Gait abnormalities